WXKW is an adult hits station licensed to Key West, Florida, broadcasting on 104.9 MHz FM. WXKW is owned by James Day and Kevin Redding, through licensee Sunny Days Radio, LLC.

References

External links

Adult hits radio stations in the United States
XKW
2010 establishments in Florida
Radio stations established in 2010